Anthony Benjamin Kay (born March 21, 1995) is an American professional baseball pitcher in the Chicago Cubs organization. He has previously played in Major League Baseball (MLB) for the Toronto Blue Jays. Kay was drafted by the New York Mets in the first round with the 31st pick in the 2016 MLB draft.

Career

Amateur
Kay attended Ward Melville High School in East Setauket, New York. He was drafted by the New York Mets in the 29th round of the 2013 Major League Baseball Draft, but did not sign. He attended the University of Connecticut to play college baseball.

As a freshman at Connecticut in 2014, Kay appeared in 18 games and made eight starts. He went 5–4 with a 3.49 earned run average (ERA) and 56 strikeouts. As a sophomore, he started 14 out of 17 games and was 8–6 with a 2.07 ERA with 96 strikeouts. As a junior, he started 17 games, going 9–2 with a 2.65 ERA and 111 strikeouts. In 2014 and 2015, he played collegiate summer baseball with the Wareham Gatemen of the Cape Cod Baseball League.

New York Mets
The New York Mets selected Kay in the first round of the 2016 Major League Baseball Draft (31st overall) using the compensatory pick they received after the Washington Nationals signed Daniel Murphy. Kay did not appear in any games in the Mets' organization after being drafted and then underwent Tommy John surgery on October 4, 2016, putting him out for the entire 2017 season. He returned in 2018 to play for the Columbia Fireflies and the St. Lucie Mets, combining to go 7–11 with a 4.26 ERA in  innings. In 2019, he opened the season with the Binghamton Rumble Ponies, before being promoted to the Syracuse Mets on June 14. Kay was named to the 2019 All-Star Futures Game.

Toronto Blue Jays
On July 28, 2019, the Mets traded Kay and Simeon Woods Richardson to the Blue Jays for Marcus Stroman and cash considerations. Kay was added to the major league roster on September 7 to start against the Tampa Bay Rays.

With the 2020 Toronto Blue Jays, Kay appeared in 13 games, compiling a 2-0 record with 5.14 ERA and 22 strikeouts in 21 innings pitched. On December 16 2022, Kay was designated for assignment.

Chicago Cubs
On December 23, 2022, Kay was claimed off waivers by the Chicago Cubs. The Cubs designated him for assignment on January 20, 2023, after the signing of Trey Mancini was made official. On January 24, Kay cleared waivers and was sent outright to the Triple-A Iowa Cubs.

References

External links

Connecticut Huskies bio

1995 births
Living people
American expatriate baseball players in Canada
Baseball players from New York (state)
Binghamton Rumble Ponies players
Buffalo Bisons (minor league) players
Columbia Fireflies players
Major League Baseball pitchers
People from Stony Brook, New York
UConn Huskies baseball players
St. Lucie Mets players
Syracuse Mets players
Toronto Blue Jays players
Wareham Gatemen players
Florida Complex League Blue Jays players
Ward Melville High School alumni